Həsənli is a village and municipality in the Salyan Rayon of Azerbaijan. It has a population of 1,855.

References

Populated places in Salyan District (Azerbaijan)